The 2013 season is Sporting Cristal's 58th season in the Peruvian First Division, and also the club's 58th consecutive season in the top-flight of Peruvian football.

Sporting Cristal will compete for their 17th Torneo Descentralizado title, after winning last season. In addition, the club will compete in the Copa Libertadores 2013.

Club

Coaching staff

Grounds

Players

Squad information

Transfers

In
.

Out
.

Pre-season and friendlies

Last updated: 9 February 2013

Competitions

Overview

Torneo Descentralizado

Results summary

Results by round

First stage

Second stage

Last updated: 9 February 2013Source: ClubSportingCristal.com, Soccerway.com, Footballdatabase.eu

Copa Libertadores

Group stage

Last updated: 9 February 2013
Source:Matches

Statistics

Squad statistics

Last Updated February 9, 2013

Discipline

Last Updated February 9, 2013

Goal Scorers

Overall
{|class="wikitable" style="text-align: center;"
|-
!
!Total
!Home
!Away
|-
|align=left| Games played          || 1 || 1 || 0
|-
|align=left| Games won             || 1 || 1 || 0
|-
|align=left| Games drawn           || 0 || 0 || 0
|-
|align=left| Games lost            || 0 || 0 || 0
|-
|align=left| Biggest win           || - || - || -
|-
|align=left| Biggest loss          || - || - || -
|-
|align=left| Clean sheets          || 1 || 1 || 0
|-
|align=left| Goals scored          || 1 || 1 || 0
|-
|align=left| Goals conceded        || 0 || 0 || 0
|-
|-
|-

References

External links

2013
Sporting Cristal